King Edward VI School (also known as King Edward's, or KES) is a selective co-educational private school founded in Southampton, United Kingdom, in 1553.

The school was founded at the request of William Capon, who bequeathed money in his will for a grammar school for the poor. King Edward VI signed the necessary Royal Charter in 1553 and the school opened in 1554. King Edward's became an independent school in 1978 and accepted girls into the sixth form in 1983. It became a fully co-educational school in 1994. It is a member of the Headmasters' and Headmistresses' Conference, and is a registered charity. The school roll is approximately 950 pupils.

The current building was designed by the English architect Ernest Berry Webber in the early 1930s.

History

King Edward's was founded in 1553 when King Edward VI signed the necessary Royal Charter for a school to be built out of the proceeds of the will of William Capon, who had died in 1550 and bequeathed money for a grammar school for the poor. The school opened in 1554; it became an independent school in 1978, and accepted girls into the sixth form in 1983. It became a fully co-educational school in 1994. It is a member of the Headmasters' and Headmistresses' Conference.

The current building was designed by the English architect Ernest Berry Webber in the early 1930s.  Webber was a prolific designer of public buildings, including the civic centres at Southampton, Dagenham, and Hammersmith.

Traditions and day-to-day life 

The school is divided up into 6 houses all bearing the name of ex pupils or founders: William Capon, Thomas Lake, Thomas Lawrence, Edward Reynolds, Joshua Sylvester and Isaac Watts. Each year the houses compete for points in order to win the Allen Grant Trophy.

The school motto is Dieu et mon droit (French for God and my right, referring to the monarch's divine right to govern) and is generally used as the motto of the British monarch. Originally it was spelled Dieut et mon droict, the Early Modern French spelling, but later the 't' in "Dieut" was dropped in accordance with present French orthography. The 'c' in droict was also dropped. In the 1970s the motto was 'Pax Huic Domui', 'Peace to this House' (traditionally the words a priest says when visiting a sick person). The school hymn is Our God, Our Help in Ages Past, written by a famous former pupil, Isaac Watts. The clock tower at the Civic Centre, Southampton plays the same tune at 4, 8, and 12 o'clock, after it has chimed the hour.

In 2011, 100% of pupils achieved 5+ A*-C GCSEs (or equivalent) including English and maths, with 85% achieving all English Baccalaureate subjects. The average fifth year student was entered for 11.2 qualifications.

A newsletter, KonnEctionS, is published each term and stresses the highlights and achievements of the school and its members that have occurred in the previous four months. An online bulletin is also sent to parents using the e-portal on a regular basis through each term to ensure that events are publicised. The website also publishes news about achievements and events and is updated weekly. The school publishes two formal reports. The Annual Review provides a detailed summary of the achievements of the school. A copy is given to all parents in September after Speech Day. Sotoniensis is an annual publication of the school's main social, charitable and arts events. Published in October, it aims to provide a record of all that has taken place in the previous year, and has articles covering trips, expeditions, sports results, theatre productions, etc.  The Edwardian is a biannual publication for and about alumni of King Edward's (known as Edwardians, or OEs).

As well as a main playing field, and an area of artificial turf large enough to accommodate 12 tennis courts, King Edward's owns  of sports grounds called Wellington on the edge of Southampton, where there is a water based astro pitch, along with netball courts, tennis courts, and a large number of grass pitches.

Old Edwardians 

 
 Edward Penley Abraham, biochemist
 Alan F. Alford, author
 Thomas George Adames Baker, clergyman
 Iain Brunnschweiler, cricketer
 Robert Bulling, Clerk of the Privy Council
 William Capon, rector and master of Jesus College, Cambridge
 Alec Campbell (footballer)
 James Cobban, educator
 George Bernard Cronshaw, clergyman
 Ian Dunt, journalist
 Justin Edwards, actor
 John Francis (English cricketer)
 Simon Francis (cricketer)
 Chris Grigg, chief executive of British Land
 Stephen Hammond, MP for Wimbledon
 Henry Robinson Hartley, philanthropist
 John Heath, entomologist
 Roger Helmer, UK Independence Party MEP
 James Henry Hurdis, artist
 Arthur Lake, Bishop of Bath and Wells
 Thomas Lake, politician
 Michael Langrish, bishop
 Michael Lewis (bishop)
 Eric Meadus, painter
 Nick Middleton, geographer
 Basil Mitchell (academic)
 Hugh Mitchell, actor
 Rob Moore (field hockey player)
 John Muddiman, scholar
 Darren Naish, palaeontologist
 Dennis Nineham, scholar
 George Penny, 1st Viscount Marchwood, politician
 Iain Percy, Olympic sailor
 Paul O'Prey, scholar
 Joshua Sylvester, poet
 Isaac Watts, minister and hymnist
 Hugh Whitemore, playwright/screenwriter
 Gilbert Whitley, zoologist
 Justin Young, musician

References

External links 
 School Website
 Profile on the Independent Schools Council website
  [Controversies]

Educational institutions established in the 1550s
1553 establishments in England
Member schools of the Headmasters' and Headmistresses' Conference
Private schools in Southampton
Schools with a royal charter
King Edward VI Schools